R. Shankar Memorial Arts and Science College (RSM SNDP College) was founded in 1995 in Koyilandy under the management of SNDP Koyilandy Union. Now it is one of the arts and science colleges under Calicut University.

Notable alumni
 S. K. Sajeesh, Politician

Colleges affiliated with the University of Calicut
Arts and Science colleges in Kerala
Universities and colleges in Kozhikode district
Educational institutions established in 1995
1995 establishments in Kerala